{{Infobox musical composition
| name              = Für Elise
| image             = Beethoven_WoO_59_Erstausgabe.png
| alt               = 
| caption           = First edition, 1867
| type              = Piano music
| composer          = Ludwig van Beethoven
| key               = A  minor
| catalogue         = {{plainlist|
 WoO 59—
''' Bia 515
}}
| dedication        = 
| composed          = 
| published         = 
| publisher         = 
| scoring           = 
| misc              = 
}}Bagatelle No. 25 in A minor (WoO59, Bia515) for solo piano, commonly known as "Für Elise", is one of Ludwig van Beethoven's most popular compositions.Dorothy de Val, The Cambridge Companion to the piano, Cambridge: Cambridge University Press, 1998, p. 131, "Beethoven is here [in the 1892 Repertory of select pianoforte works] only by virtue of 'Für Elise', but there is a better representation of later composers such as Schubert ... , Chopin ... , Schumann ... and some Liszt." The identity of "Elise" is unknown; researchers have suggested Therese Malfatti, Elisabeth Röckel, or Elise Barensfeld.

 History 
The score was not published until 1867, forty years after the composer's death in 1827. The discoverer of the piece, Ludwig Nohl, affirmed that the original autograph manuscript, now lost, had the title: "Für Elise am 27 April [1810] zur Erinnerung von L. v. Bthvn" ("For Elise on April 27 in memory by L. v. Bthvn"). The music was published as part of Nohl's Neue Briefe Beethovens (New letters by Beethoven) on pages 28 to 33, printed in Stuttgart by Johann Friedrich Cotta.

The version of "Für Elise" heard today is an earlier version that was transcribed by Ludwig Nohl. There is a later version, with drastic changes to the accompaniment which was transcribed from a later manuscript by the Beethoven scholar Barry Cooper. The most notable difference is in the first theme, the left-hand arpeggios are delayed by a 16th note. There are a few extra bars in the transitional section into the B section; and finally, the rising A minor arpeggio figure is moved later into the piece. The tempo marking Poco moto is believed to have been on the manuscript that Ludwig Nohl transcribed (now lost). The later version includes the marking Molto grazioso. It is believed that Beethoven intended to add the piece to a cycle of bagatelles.

Whatever the validity of Nohl's edition, an editorial peculiarity contained in it involves whether the second right-hand note in bar 7, that is, the first note of the three-note upbeat figure that characterizes the main melody, is an E4 or a D4. Nohl's score gives E4 in bar 7, but D4 thereafter in all parallel passages. Many editions change all of the figures to beginning with E4 until the final bars, where D4 is used and resolved by adding a C to the final A octave. A point in favor of the D4 is that the ascending seventh of the motive in this form is repeated in sequence in bars 9 to 11 that begin the second section of the principal theme.

The pianist and musicologist  argued in his thesis and his 2010 book Beethoven al piano (new Italian edition: Beethoven al pianoforte, 2014) that Beethoven might not have been the person who gave the piece the form that we know today. Chiantore suggested that the original signed manuscript, upon which Ludwig Nohl claimed to base his transcription, may never have existed. On the other hand, Barry Cooper wrote, in a 1984 essay in The Musical Times, that one of two surviving sketches closely resembles the published version.

 Identity of "Elise" 
It is not certain who "Elise" was, although a list of possible dedicatees have been suggested by various scholars over the years. Evidence suggests that "Elise" was a close friend of Beethoven and probably an important figure in his life.

 Therese Malfatti 

Max Unger suggested that Ludwig Nohl may have transcribed the title incorrectly and the original work may have been named "Für Therese", a reference to Therese Malfatti von Rohrenbach zu Dezza (1792–1851). She was a friend and student of Beethoven's to whom he supposedly proposed in 1810, though she turned him down to marry the Austrian nobleman and state official Wilhelm von Droßdik in 1816. Note that the piano sonata no. 24, dedicated to Countess Thérèse von Brunswick, is also referred to sometimes as "für Therese". The Austrian musicologist Michael Lorenz has shown that Rudolf Schachner, who in 1851 inherited Therese von Droßdik's musical scores, was the son of Babette Bredl, born out of wedlock. Babette in 1865 let Nohl copy the autograph in her possession. Dr. Robert Greenberg, who teaches music through The Great Courses, as well as the San Francisco Conservatory of Music and elsewhere, points out that Beethoven's notoriously sloppy handwriting might easily have led to the title "Fur Therese" being misread as "Fur Elise".

 Elisabeth Röckel 

According to a 2010 study by Klaus Martin Kopitz, there is evidence that the piece was written for the 17-year-old German soprano singer Elisabeth Röckel (1793–1883), the younger sister of Joseph August Röckel, who played Florestan in the 1806 revival of Beethoven's opera Fidelio. "Elise", as she was called by a parish priest (later she called herself "Betty"), had been a friend of Beethoven's since 1808, who, according to Kopitz, perhaps wanted to marry her. But in April 1810 Elisabeth Röckel got an engagement at the theater in Bamberg where she made her stage debut as Donna Anna in Mozart's Don Giovanni and became a friend of the writer E. T. A. Hoffmann. In 1811 Röckel came back to Vienna, in 1813 she married there Beethoven's friend Johann Nepomuk Hummel.

In 2015 Kopitz published further sources about Beethoven's relationship to Röckel and the famous piano piece. It shows that she was also a close friend of Anna Milder-Hauptmann and lived together with her and her brother Joseph August in the Theater an der Wien. In a letter to Röckel, which she wrote in 1830, she indeed called her "Elise".

In 2020 an extended English version of Kopitz's essay was published with some new sources.

 Elise Barensfeld 
In 2014, the Canadian musicologist Rita Steblin suggested that Elise Barensfeld might be the dedicatee. Born in Regensburg and treated for a while as a child prodigy, she first travelled on concert tours with Beethoven's friend Johann Nepomuk Mälzel, also from Regensburg, and then lived with him for some time in Vienna, where she received singing lessons from Antonio Salieri. Steblin argues that Beethoven dedicated this work to the 13-year-old Elise Barensfeld as a favour to Therese Malfatti who lived opposite Mälzel's and Barensfeld's residence and who might have given her piano lessons. Steblin admits that question marks remain for her hypothesis.

 Music 
The piece can be heard as a five-part rondo, with the form A-B-A-C-A. It is in A minor and in  time. It begins with the refrain A, a flowing melody in binary form marked Poco moto (literally "a little motion," a tempo indication that does not appear elsewhere in Beethoven's works), with an arpeggiated left hand accompaniment. The unaccompanied oscillation between the dominant E and its chromatic lower neighbor D-sharp that begins the melody has become one of the most recognizable openings in classical music, but it also serves as a main topic of musical discussion. The digression at measure 9 glances at the relative major before returning to the original theme and key, preceded by a prolongation of the dominant, E that extends the opening lower-neighbor oscillation. The pitch outline of these bars, E-F-E-D-C-B, i.e. an upper-neighbor ascent to F5 followed by a descending scale, also forms the basis of the two episodes B and C, thus unifying the piece. The B section that begins in bar 23 is in the submediant, F major. Its theme begins by tracing the outline mentioned above in somewhat elaborated fashion and modulates to the dominant, followed by 32nd-note runs repeating a cadential progression in C major in a codetta-like passage. (The chordal three-note upbeats in the left hand have been anticipated by the transition to this episode in bar 22, a clever unifying touch.) This suggests a rather expansive form, but Beethoven suddenly returns to the dominant of A minor in bar 34, once again lingering on the dominant E and its lower neighbor and leading to an exact repeat of the A section. Although another nominal episode follows (C) at bar 59, it does not leave the tonic and is rather coda-like in feel, unfolding over a dramatic, throbbing tonic pedal in the bass and emphatically cadencing in the home key. Once again, there are unifying relationships with previously heard material. The melody retraces the descending outline alluded to earlier, and the cadence in bars 66-67 is an augmented version of the theme's cadence in bars 7–8. After a glance at a Neapolitan harmony (B-flat major) and a cadence at bar 76 that brings the music to a complete halt for the first and only time, an ascending A minor arpeggio and a chromatic descent over two octaves follows, sort of a cadenza in tempo, leading to a final repetition of the A section. The piece concludes without an added postlude.

Kopitz presents the finding by the German organ scholar  that the letters that spell Elise can be decoded as the first three notes of the piece. Because an E is called an Es in German and is pronounced as "S", that makes E–(L)–(I)–S–E: E–(L)–(I)–E–E, which by enharmonic equivalents sounds the same as the written notes E–(L)–(I)–D–E'''.

Incipit:

Notes

References

External links 

 
 "Für Elise" at the Mutopia Project
 
 1822 revised version
 Michael Lorenz: "Maria Eva Hummel. A Postscript", Vienna 2013
 Michael Lorenz: "A Letter to the Editor of The Musical Times", Vienna 2014

1810 compositions
Compositions by Ludwig van Beethoven published posthumously
Compositions in A minor
Music with dedications
Piano solos by Ludwig van Beethoven